Mordellistena baliani is a species of beetle in the genus Mordellistena of the family Mordellidae. It was described in 1942 by Franciscolo and is endemic to Italy.

References

baliani
Beetles described in 1942
Endemic fauna of Italy
Beetles of Europe